Walker County is a county located in the east central section of the U.S. state of Texas. As of the 2020 census, its population was 76,400. Its county seat is Huntsville. Initially, Walker County was named for Robert J. Walker, a legislator from Mississippi who introduced into the United States Congress the resolution to annex Texas. Walker later supported the U.S. during its Civil War and earned some enmity for it. In order to keep the county's name, the state renamed it for Samuel H. Walker (no relation), a Texas Ranger and soldier in the United States Army.

Walker County comprises the Huntsville Micropolitan Statistical Area which is part of the Houston-The Woodlands Combined Statistical Area.

Geography

Major highways
  Interstate 45
  U.S. Highway 190
  State Highway 19
  State Highway 30
  State Highway 75
  State Highway 150

Adjacent counties
 Houston County (north)
 Trinity County (northeast)
 San Jacinto County (east)
 Montgomery County (south)
 Grimes County (west)
 Madison County (northwest)

National protected area
 Sam Houston National Forest (part)

Demographics

Note: the US Census treats Hispanic/Latino as an ethnic category. This table excludes Latinos from the racial categories and assigns them to a separate category. Hispanics/Latinos can be of any race.

As of the census of 2000, there were 61,758 people, 18,303 households, and 11,384 families residing in the county.  The population density was 78 people per square mile (30/km2).  There were 21,099 housing units at an average density of 27 per square mile (10/km2).  The racial makeup of the county was 69.12% white, 23.88% black or African American, 0.35% Native American, 0.77% Asian, 0.05% Pacific Islander, 4.42% from other races, and 1.41% from two or more races.  14.11% of the population were Hispanic or Latino of any race.

There were 18,303 households, out of which 28.70% had children under the age of 18 living with them, 46.80% were married couples living together, 11.70% had a female householder with no husband present, and 37.80% were non-families. 27.00% of all households were made up of individuals, and 8.00% had someone living alone who was 65 years of age or older.  The average household size was 2.44 and the average family size was 3.02.

In the county, the population was spread out, with 18.00% under the age of 18, 23.00% from 18 to 24, 31.10% from 25 to 44, 18.90% from 45 to 64, and 8.90% who were 65 years of age or older.  The median age was 31 years. For every 100 females, there were 151.10 males.  For every 100 females age 18 and over, there were 161.90 males.

The median income for a household in the county was $31,468, and the median income for a family was $42,589. Males had a median income of $27,634 versus $22,579 for females. The per capita income for the county was $14,508.  About 10.60% of families and 18.40% of the population were below the poverty line, including 19.10% of those under age 18 and 13.40% of those age 65 or over.

Education
Sam Houston State University is located in Huntsville.

School districts serving portions of the county include:
 Huntsville Independent School District
 New Waverly Independent School District
 Richards Independent School District (portion)
 Trinity Independent School District (portion)

The Gulf Coast Trades Center, a charter school, is in an unincorporated area of the county.

The Huntsville and New Waverly ISDs are assigned to Lone Star College. Areas of Walker County in Trinity ISD are assigned to Angelina College. The portion of Richards ISD in Walker County is zoned to Blinn College.

Government and infrastructure

The headquarters of the Texas Department of Criminal Justice (TDCJ), the Texas agency that operates adult state correctional facilities, are in Huntsville.

Walker County has the highest number of state prisons and jails of all of the counties in Texas. Several TDCJ prisons for men, including the Byrd Unit, the Goree Unit, the Huntsville Unit, and the Wynne Unit, are in the Huntsville city limits. The Holliday Unit, a transfer unit, is in Huntsville. In addition the Ellis Unit and the Estelle Unit are in unincorporated areas of Walker County. The Huntsville Unit houses the State of Texas execution chamber.

Politics

Communities

Cities
 Huntsville (county seat)
 New Waverly
 Riverside

Unincorporated community
 Dodge

Notable people
 Eugene C. Barker
 Marilyn McAdams Sibley
 Sherri Ann Jarvis, previously unidentified teenager found murdered on November 1, 1980
 Slater Martin (Basketball Player)

See also

 National Register of Historic Places listings in Walker County, Texas
 Recorded Texas Historic Landmarks in Walker County
 John N. Raney
 Kate Borcherding

References

External links

 

 
1846 establishments in Texas
Populated places established in 1846
Greater Houston